In Greek mythology, Gorgythion (Ancient Greek: Γοργυθίων, gen.: Γοργυθίωνος) was one of the sons of King Priam of Troy at the time of the Trojan War and appears as a minor character in Homer's Iliad.  His mother was Castianeira of Aisyme.

Name and description
In the Iliad, Gorgythion is described as beautiful, and his epithet is the blameless. Jane Ellen Harrison pointed out that "blameless" (άμύμων) was an epithet of the heroized dead, who were venerated and appeased at shrines. Zeus even applies the epithet to Aegisthus, the usurper, Harrison observes.
The epithet άμύμων in Homer is applied to individual heroes, to a hero's tomb [Odyssey xxiv.80], to magical, half-mythical peoples like the Phaeacians and Aethiopians [Iliad x.423] who to the popular imagination are half canonized, to the magic island [Odyssey xii.261] of the god Helios, to the imaginary half-magical Good Old King [Odyssey xix.109]. It is used also of the 'convoy' [Iliad vi.171] sent by the gods, which of course is magical in character; it is never, I believe, an epithet of the Olympians themselves.  There is about the word a touch of what is magical and demonic rather than actually divine.

In applying "blameless" to Gorgythion, then, the poet may have been reflecting a tradition of cult among his descendants, that was known to Homer or in the Homeric tradition. John Pairman Brown has suggested that Gorgythion's name "surely echoes the Gergithes; the 'Gergithes remnants of the Teucrians' are projected back into the heroic age as individual antagonists".

According to Herodotus, the Gergithes were "the remnants of the ancient Teucrians" (that is, of the ancient Trojans).

Family
Near the end of the Iliad, Priam himself tells Achilles: "I begat the bravest sons in wide Troy, of whom I say that none are left. Fifty there were to me, when the sons of the Greeks arrived; nineteen indeed from one womb, but the others women bore to me in my palaces. And of the greater number fierce Mars indeed has relaxed the knees under them..." Gorgythion is referred to at his death as "...the brave son
of Priam". Of Gorgythion's mother Castianeira, Homer says (in Samuel Butler's translation) "His mother, fair Castianeira, lovely as a goddess, had been married from Aesyme."

The Bibliotheca says that Priam had nine sons and four daughters by Hecuba (the sons being Hector, Paris, Deiphobus, Helenus, Pammon, Polites, Antiphus, Hipponous, Polydorus,  and the daughters Creusa, Laodice, Polyxena, and the prophetess Cassandra), and he names thirty-eight sons by other women, including Troilus, Hippothous, Kebriones, and Gorgythion.

In the Fabulae of Gaius Julius Hyginus, fable 90 consists wholly of a list of "Sons and daughters of Priam to the number of fifty-five", in which Gorgythion is included.

Mythology
Gorgythion is killed by an arrow of Teucer's at lines 303–305 of Book VIII of the Iliad, although Teucer's target is Gorgythion's brother Hector. Teucer aims two arrows at Hector, but kills first Gorgythion and next Hector's friend Archeptolemus, which serves to increase the impression of Hector's elusiveness and strength.

When Gorgythion dies, Homer says – 

Susanne Lindgren Wofford comments on this simile "But the poppy is not wilted or dead, just top-heavy; in any case, a poppy will return every spring to bow its head, but Gorgythion's death is final; it is a unique event that does not participate in any natural cycles of renewal or return... to make death seem beautiful is to transform it into something different."

In Alexander Pope's looser but more poetic translation (1715–1720), the death scene reads –

This translation of the Iliad was called by Samuel Johnson "a performance which no age or nation could hope to equal", while Richard Bentley wrote: "It is a pretty poem, Mr Pope, but you must not call it Homer."

In the 4th century AD, a Roman called Q. Septimius published Dictys Cretensis Ephemeridos belli Trojani, purporting to be a translation by Lucius Septimius of a chronicle of the Trojan War by Dictys of Crete, the companion of Idomeneus during the Trojan War. In Book 3, Patroclus, and not Teucer, is said to have killed Gorgythion:

Other uses of the name
The name Gorgythion was given to a genus of Pyrginae, North American butterflies commonly known as Spread-winged Skippers, in Frederick Du Cane Godman and O. Salvin's Biologia Centrali Americana (1896).
48373 Gorgythion is an asteroid of the Solar System, discovered on 16 October 1977, by C. J. van Houten and I. van Houten-Groeneveld.

See also
List of children of Priam
List of Trojan War characters

Notes

References 

 Dictys Cretensis, from The Trojan War. The Chronicles of Dictys of Crete and Dares the Phrygian translated by Richard McIlwaine Frazer, Jr. (1931–). Indiana University Press. 1966. Online version at the Topos Text Project.
 Gaius Julius Hyginus, Fabulae from The Myths of Hyginus translated and edited by Mary Grant. University of Kansas Publications in Humanistic Studies. Online version at the Topos Text Project.
 Herodotus, The Histories with an English translation by A. D. Godley. Cambridge. Harvard University Press. 1920. Online version at the Topos Text Project. Greek text available at Perseus Digital Library.
 Homer, The Iliad with an English Translation by A.T. Murray, PhD in two volumes. Cambridge, MA., Harvard University Press; London, William Heinemann, Ltd. 1924. Online version at the Perseus Digital xLibrary.
 Homer, Homeri Opera in five volumes. Oxford, Oxford University Press. 1920. Greek text available at the Perseus Digital Library.
 Pseudo-Apollodorus, The Library with an English Translation by Sir James George Frazer, F.B.A., F.R.S. in 2 Volumes, Cambridge, MA, Harvard University Press; London, William Heinemann Ltd. 1921. Online version at the Perseus Digital Library. Greek text available from the same website.

Trojans
Children of Priam
Princes in Greek mythology